A Gest of Robyn Hode (also known as A Lyttell Geste of Robyn Hode, and hereafter referred to as Gest) is an example of a Middle English minstrel ballad, in which the verses are grouped in quatrains with an abcb rhyme scheme. Based upon evidence contained within the work, it was probably compiled during the early 15th century as a narrative sequence of early 14th century Robin Hood tales.

Gest (which meant tale or adventure) was included in the Child Ballads.
Since their publication, various scholars have attempted to construct a classification for the ballads. Gest, along with the Border ballads, and the other Robin Hood ballads, have been recognised as being distinct from the other Child ballads. They are narratives, which generally lack a chorus or refrain, and appear to have been composed as recitations before an audience. Only Gest is considered comparable to the Danish and English heroic ballads, the epic poem Beowulf, and the great Middle English romances – Havelok the Dane and The Tale of Gamelyn.

Rhyme and rhythm schemes 

Thus begins the Gest; calling all free-born gentlemen to hear tales of the good yeoman Robyn Hode. Gest is a ballad, in which the verses are arranged in quatrains. The lines within the quatrain have an abcb rhyme scheme, in which the last words of lines 2 and 4 rhyme, but the last words of lines 1 and 3 may or may not. The words in each line also have a rhythm (or beat) due to the combinations of stressed and unstressed syllables. Lines 1 and 3 have four stressed syllables, while lines 2 and 4 have three stressed syllables. Each stressed syllable is preceded by one or two unstressed syllables. Here is another excerpt, which should be read aloud to hear the rhythm of the stressed syllables (in bold font):

A musical interpretation of this vocal pattern was recorded in 2002 by Bob Frank in a modern English version entitled A Little Gest of Robin Hood. Frank accompanied himself with an acoustic guitar, while reciting the lines in a talking blues style.

Narrative ballad 

Gest is not one single continuous narrative ballad (sometimes called a chronicle ballad). It contains four older tales of Robin Hood, broken up into 1, 2, or 3 episodes. The episodes then interleave among the eight fyttes (sections) of the ballad. Transitions between the episodes connect them together as a single narrative. A summary of the Gest narrative is given here.

A linguistic study of Gest indicates that many of its component tales were originally composed in the Northern and East Midland dialects. These dialects are prevalent around Barnsdale and Nottingham, which are the main locations mentioned in the original tales. The authors of those tales would probably have been familiar with the traditional narrative ballads of the Anglo-Scottish border.

Fowler's reconstruction of narrative ballad history 

As the Child Ballads were being prepared for publication, there was an ongoing debate among those who studied ballad origins. Those who considered that ballads originated as communal songs and dances were known as communalists; those who supported the opposing position, that ballads were written by individual authors, were known as individualists. This debate involved questions that have since been "discarded as subjects for fruitful inquiry". In other words, the question of communal versus individual origination can never be answered due to lack of historical evidence. (For further details, see Roger D. Abrahams' review of Anglo-American Folksong Scholarship since 1898 by D. K. Wilgus.) The current consensus is that, since so little is known about the origins of the earliest ballads, their origins can only be deduced from clues within the texts themselves; that is, on a case-by-case basis. It was advocated by the English historian J R Maddicott in a series of articles in the journal Past & Present (1958–61) and re-iterated in 1978.

In 1968, D. C. Fowler proposed a new reconstruction of the history of the narrative ballad, based upon his study of Gest, and the oldest Robin Hood ballads (Robin Hood and the Monk, and Robin Hood and the Potter). His proposal was that the narrative ballad is a subcategory of folksong that uses a narrative form. The narrative ballad, as it appeared in England during the 15th–16th centuries, was a result of the merger of several different traditions. The first tradition was folksong, which appeared about the 12th century, and became more widespread during the 13th–15th centuries with the appearance of carols and religious songs sung in the vernacular. The second tradition was itself the result of a 14th-century blending of the 12th century French courtly romances (such as the Arthurian romances) with the Old English alliterative traditional poetry to form a new genre of English metrical narrative romance (such as those included in the Ancient Engleish Metrical Romanceës). These romances are usually associated with royal court minstrels, but minstrels were also present at the great baronial halls of the north of England. These powerful barons, such as the House of Percy, the House of Neville, and the York and Lancaster cadet branches of the Plantagenet dynasty, maintained courts which rivalled the Royal Court in London.

Fowler's proposal was both strongly opposed and applauded for his attempt to construct a history of ballads based upon the earliest dates of surviving texts and not upon comparative structure and form. Independent support for minstrel origins was offered by several historians. Maurice Keen, in his first edition (1961) of The Outlaws of Medieval Legend argued that the ballad form of the Robin Hood stories indicated a primitive popular origin. In the Introduction to his second edition (1977), Keen stated that criticism forced him to abandon his original arguments He now supported the position that the narrative ballads were minstrel compositions. Unfortunately, he never revised the pertinent chapters (XI and XIV) to reflect his new position. In 1989, J C Holt also advocated a minstrel origin for the Robin Hood ballads when he proposed that the original audience was the yeoman servants of the English feudal households, especially those of Thomas, 2nd Earl of Lancaster, a grandson of Henry III. Holt proposed the ballads were then spread from the great halls to market-places, taverns and inns, where the common people heard them.

Sung or recited?  

Fowler contended that the Robin Hood ballads were not true ballads because they were recited, not sung. His evidence is two-fold: (1) unrelated manuscripts, approximately from the same time at which Gest may have been compiled, which mention Robin Hood, and (2) internal passages from Gest and the two oldest Robin Hood ballads in manuscript form which are approximately contemporaneous with Gest: Robin Hood and the Monk, and Robin Hood and the Potter.

Contemporary evidence 
This interpretation of the contemporary manuscripts was originally proposed by Chambers, which Fowler incorporated into his hypothesis. The importance of the manuscripts is not only that they mentioned Robin Hood, but also what they said about him. The manuscripts are:
Dives and Pauper (dated to ca 1410) refers to "tale or a song of robyn hode"
According to Fowler, the use of the words sing or song refers, not to the melodic singing of a folksong, but to a type of chanting known as plainsong. This view can be supported by one of the meanings of the Middle English singen ("to sing"): to relate a story in song or verse; to recite a poem.
Scotichronicon (dated to ca 1450), written by Bower in Latin, uses the phrases "cantitare delectantur" and "recitantur" in its mention of Robin Hood and Little John in the then-popular "romanciis, mimos, ei bardanos"
cantitare delectanturloosely translated as "delightful singing" or
as "delightful recitation"
recitanturmeans as "reading aloud"
romanciismeans "narratives, stories, or historical accounts"
mimosmeans "mimic plays"
In other words, Bower is talking about delightful stories about Robin Hood which are being performed in song and/or recitation.
Historia Majoris Britanniae (dated 1521), written by Mair in Latin, contains a remark that the exploits of Robin Hood are known throughout England in "cantibus"
cantibusmeans "a singing tone in the delivery of an orator"
Perhaps "a singing tone" is not descriptive enough; it is rhythm, cadance, and word choice that makes a great orator. Churchill's second and third speeches delivered during the Battle of France, as well as Franklin Roosevelt's first inaugural address and Day of infamy address are examples from two of the masters of the radio address.

Internal evidence 

The internal evidence offered by Fowler consists of passages within the three ballads:
 the use of speech verbs, such as speak, talk, and tell:
 Robin Hood and the Potter contains the line "Now speak we of Roben Hode"
 Robin Hood and the Monk ends with the line "Thus ends the talking of the monk/And Robyn Hode ..."
 the opening stanza of Gest contains "I shall you tell of a good yeoman," 
 the use of transitions
 between Fyttes 1 and 2 
 at the beginning of Fytte 4 
 between the end of the Monk tale and resumption of the Sorrowful Knight tale in Fytte 4 
 the use of frequent asides to the audience

The most compelling internal evidence is the repeated use of the "Lythe and listen" formulaic. It is found:
at the beginning of Fyttes 1, 3, 6
in the second stanza of Fytte 5
"lythe" comes from Old Norse[U of MI's MED]. When used in the phrase "lythe and listen" it means "to hear, to be attentive" (as in the colloquialism "listen up!"). The Gest poet uses this formulaic whenever a new tale is about to begin. Considering the length of the ballad, it is possible that the ballad was broken up into sections for performance; and the "Lythe and listen" would alert the audience that the performance was about to resume.[who said this?]

Appalachian music 

More support for Gest having been recited comes from an unusual source. In the United States, the Scots-Irish and Lowland Scots immigrants brought their ballads to the isolated valleys in the southern Appalachian Mountains of Virginia, Kentucky, Tennessee, western North Carolina and northern Georgia. Their music became known as Appalachian music, which would later strongly influence the distinctly American genre known as hillbilly or country music. 

The old Scottish and English ballads were eagerly sought by the folksong collectors of the 1920s and 30s,and a series of books brought ballads and folksongs to scholarly attention in the United States. In 1927, American poet Carl Sandberg published The American Songbag. Sandberg's book would greatly influence the singer-songwriters of the American folk music revival in popular music during the 1960s. In 1959, D K Wilgus, an American Professor of Music and English, published Anglo-American Folksong scholarship since 1898. The book was unusual at the time for its inclusion of a discography of amateur American folk singers whose audio performances were recorded on long-playing records.  

The 1952 release of the Anthology of American Folk Music fuelled the folksong revival of the 1950s–60s. This collection of the old ballads inspired a new generation of folk singers, such as Pete Seeger, Joan Baez, and Bob Dylan. The folksong revival also introduced the recitation song to a new audience. In a recitation song, the stanzas are spoken according to their natural rhyme and rhythm.

In 1961, singer-songwriter Jimmy Dean released Big Bad John, a country song in which the stanzas are recited. Dean's rendition is famous for both his Texas drawl and the use of a hammer and a piece of steel as part of the instrumental accompaniment. Dean received the Grammy Award for Best Country & Western Performance. In 1979, The Charlie Daniels Band had their biggest hit with the recitation song The Devil Went Down to Georgia. Daniels (who had a North Carolina-flavor of Southern English) won the Grammy Award for Best Country Vocal Performance.

Fowler summarised his position on the Robin Hood texts as follows: "early outlaw texts are clear examples of late medieval minstrelsy rather than songs." Douglas Grey, the first J. R. R. Tolkien Professor of English Literature and Language at the University of Oxford and a Robin Hood scholar, seconded that opinion when he endorsed Bob Frank's rendition: "This is how they must have done it! This is how they all did it!"

Why Gest is unique among Robin Hood ballads 

Both Child and his successor Kittredge gathered about themselves a group of students to continue the study of the ballads. Francis Barton Gummere was a student who assisted Child in compiling the ballads. Gummere later wrote two books which were based upon their collaboration: Old English Ballads and The Popular Ballad. In the latter book, Gummere described a classification scheme based upon the ballad structure and form.

Two other students of Kittredge expanded upon Gummere's classification scheme. Walter Morris Hart studied under Kittredge and later wrote Ballad and Epic. A Study in the Development of the Narrative Art. Hart examined ballads from each of Gummere's classes, and compared Gest to Beowulf and The Song of Roland. Hart looked more closely at the levels of elaboration and accretation, among ballads of the same class and between ballads of different classes. Elaboration (defined by Hart as growth from within) describes the differences in choral ballads and narrative ballads. As the narrative becomes more important, the characterisations, the surroundings, and the inter-relationships become more detailed. This increased level of detail allows for a more nuanced portrait of an individual's character, motives, and an understanding of their state of mind. Accretation (defined by Hart as the accumulation of independent events) is the complexity which arises in the narrative as the central character becomes a heroic figure, and represents the community's ideals. On the basis of its elaboration and accretation, Hart judged Gest as "an epic in the making". In Hart's opinion, Gest is surpassed only by the Danish and English heroic ballads, and Beowulf and Roland. In other words, Gest stands apart from, and above, the rest of the Robin Hood ballads.

William Hall Clawson wrote his doctoral thesis on the Robin Hood ballads, which was later published as The Gest of Robin Hood. Prior to its publication, Clawson wrote an article, Ballad and Epic, which summarised his synthesis of the work done by Gummere and Hart. Clawson's literary analysis of Gest has been considered as fundamental to later scholars.[who said this?]
 
In 1974, J. B. Bessinger, Jr. took another look at this topic in The Gest of Robin Hood Revisited. Contending that the term "epic" was confusing, he called Gest "a minor heroic poem", on the basis of his comparison of Gest with Havelok the Dane and The Tale of Gamelyn. Extending his comparison to the themes and content of Thomas Malory's Le Morte d'Arthur, Bessinger concluded that Gest lies somewhere between a ballad, epic, and a romance.

Child ballad 

In Child's first edition he devoted volume V to the Robin Hood ballads, and he placed Gest as number 4.  Volume 3 of his second edition still had Gest in fourth place, but he reassigned the ballad as number 117, reflecting an overall numbering system. In the Roud Folk Song Index, Gest is listed as number 70.

Notes

References

External links

Gest of Robyn Hode
Gest of Robyn Hode